The 1994–95 European football season was the 91st season of Sport Lisboa e Benfica's existence and the club's 61st consecutive season in both Portuguese football and UEFA competitions. The season ran from 1 July 1994 to 30 June 1995; Benfica competed domestically in the Primeira Divisão and the Taça de Portugal. The club also participated in the UEFA Champions League as a result of winning the previous league.

After winning their latest title, Benfica made significant changes to its squad and management. It sacked Toni and replaced him with Artur Jorge. In the transfer market, the club was far more active than the past seasons. It signed over a dozen players with Michel Preud'homme, Dimas Teixeira and Paulo Bento becoming regulars. They were joined by two loans, Claudio Caniggia and Edílson, both would be the top-scorers of the team. In the departures, fan favourites like Rui Costa or Schwarz were sold, while others like Rui Àguas, Kulkov, Silvino and Hernâni Neves were released.

On the pitch, Benfica started the season by losing the 1993 Supertaça to Porto. In the Primeira Divisão, they started winning, but quickly lost their plot. In the Champions League, Jorge led Benfica to the knockout stage after coming first in their group. As the season progress, Benfica performance stabilised and starting early December, they rack up over ten wins in a row. This allowed them to close distances to leader Porto, and progress to the quarter-finals of the Portuguese Cup.

In late February, in the decisive stage of the season, Benfica slipped again in the Primeira Divisão, and were eliminated in the other competitions. Til the end, Benfica could only win about half of their remaining fourteen match-days, finishing in third place, 15 points behind Porto. In their last match of the season, they lost another Supertaça to Porto.

Season summary
In the post-season of a title winning year, Benfica made the surprise choice of releasing Toni, who had been closely associated with the managerial position since assuming the assistant position to Sven-Göran Eriksson in 1982. To replace him, the club chose Artur Jorge. The Portuguese manager was known for the eight titles won at FC Porto, notoriously, the 1986–87 European Cup, plus had just led Paris Saint-Germain to their second league title in history, in the past season. With the club still in financial despair, they were forced to sell important players to gather funds. Rising star, Rui Costa was sold to Fiorentina, reportedly because they offer more money than Barcelona. Schwarz joined Arsenal for 1.8 million pounds, and others left the club, either for disciplinary reasons as with Kulkov and Yuran, or old age, like Rui Àguas.

The club sought reinforcements mostly indoors, like Paulo Bento and Dimas, with a few arriving from abroad, with Preud'Homme and Caniggia gathering the most expectations. The season began with the replay match of the 1993 Supertaça Cândido de Oliveira, ending in another loss on the penalty shoot-out, similar to the 1991 edition. On the league campaign, the situation was better, as Benfica racked up three straight wins; however a loss against União de Leiria on 18 September, put the team behind on the title race by two points.

Benfica could not regain any point back over October, ending the month with a four points disadvantage to leader Sporting. Although the domestically, the season was not going according to the club best hopes; in Europe, the track record was much better, with a spot on the next phase secured with one match to spare. Already approaching New Year, the odds in the renewing the title race were further diminished, with a loss in Alvalade expanding the gap to the leader by a point.

The first months of 1995 were the teams best throughout the season, as they reduced the distance to the league leader, Porto, to only three points by Match-day 20 after an eight-game winning streak. However, in the next two months, at the deciding part of the season, the club dropped more points to Leiria, and then lost four times in six games, re-opening the gap to Porto to twelve points, finishing any hope of renewing the title. In the other competitions, the prospect was the same, Benfica was knock-out of the Champions League by A.C. Milan, and on the Taça de Portugal, by Vitória Setúbal.

The final games of the season were only spent securing a place in the next year European competitions, having the bitter taste of losing both games against Sporting, for a fourth time in history, the first since 1954. The Derby de Lisboa on the 30 of April was also controversial because of the irregular dismissal of Caniggia by referee Jorge Coroado; causing the match to be repeated on 14 July (2–0 win for Benfica), and then annulled on FIFA order. After finishing the league fifteen points behind them, as they regained the title back, Benfica met Porto on the replay of the 1994 Supertaça Cândido de Oliveira in Paris, which was left unresolved from early in the season. The northerners won one-nil and took home their eight Supertaça Cândido de Oliveira.

Competitions

Overall record

Supertaça Cândido de Oliveira

1993 Edition

1994 Edition

Primeira Divisão

League table

Results by round

Matches

Taça de Portugal

UEFA Champions League

Group stage

Group C

Knockout stage

Quarter-finals

Friendlies

Player statistics
The squad for the season consisted of the players listed in the tables below, as well as staff member Artur Jorge(manager) and Zoran Filipovic (assistant manager).

|}

Transfers

In

In by loan

Out

Out by loan

References

Bibliography
 

S.L. Benfica seasons
Benfica